The Library of Trinity College Dublin serves Trinity College and the University of Dublin. It is a legal deposit or "copyright library", under which, publishers in Ireland must deposit a copy of all their publications there, without charge. It is the only Irish library to hold such rights for works published in the United Kingdom.

The Library is the permanent home to the Brian Boru harp which is a national symbol of Ireland, a copy of the 1916 Proclamation of the Irish Republic, and the Book of Kells. One of the four volumes of the Book of Kells is on public display at any given time. The volumes and pages shown are regularly changed; a new display case installed in 2020 will allow all pages to be displayed including many not seen in public for several decades. Members of the University of Dublin also have access to the libraries of Tallaght University Hospital and the Irish School of Ecumenics, Milltown.

Constituent buildings
The Library proper occupies several buildings, six of which are at the Trinity College campus itself, with another part of the Trinity Centre at St James's Hospital, Dublin:
The oldest library building, now known as the Old Library, is Thomas Burgh's magnum opus. Construction began in 1712. A large building which took twenty years to complete in its original form, it towered over the university and city after its completion in 1732. Even today, surrounded by similarly scaled buildings, it is imposing and dominates the view of the university from Nassau Street. The Book of Kells is located in the Old Library, along with the Book of Durrow, the Garland of Howth and other ancient texts. Also incorporating the Long Room, the Old Library is one of Ireland's biggest tourist attractions and holds thousands of rare, and in many cases very early, volumes. In the 18th century, the college received the Brian Boru harp, one of the three surviving medieval Gaelic harps, and a national symbol of Ireland, which is now housed in the Library. Housed within the Old Library are:
Early Printed Books and Special Collections.
Manuscripts & Archives.
The Berkeley/Lecky/Ussher (BLU) Libraries complex, incorporating:
The Berkeley Library, in Fellows' Square. Designed by Paul Koralek of ABK Architects, an imposing Brutalist structure opened in 1967 as the "New Library". The Berkeley name was adopted in 1978.
The Lecky Library, attached to the Arts Building. Also designed by ABK, officially opened in 1978.
The Ussher Library, overlooking College Park. Designed by McCullough Mulvin Architects, officially opened in 2003.
The Glucksman Map Library.
The Preservation and Conservation Department.
The Hamilton Science and Engineering Library, located within the Hamilton Building.
The 1937 Reading Room (for postgraduate use).
The John Stearne Medical Library (JSML), housed at St James's Hospital.

Further materials are held in storage in Stacks, either in closed access within College or at a book depository in the Dublin suburb of Santry.

History
The Library began with the founding of Trinity College in 1592. In 1661, Henry Jones presented it with the Book of Kells, its most famous manuscript. James Ussher (1625–56), Archbishop of Armagh, whose most important works were "Veterum Epistolarum Hibernicarum Sylloge" (1632) and "Brittanicarum Ecclesiarum Antiquitates" (1639), left his valuable library, comprising several thousand printed books and manuscripts, to the Library. His complete works were published by the Library in twenty-four volumes.

In 1801, the Library was given legal deposit rights, making it the only library in Ireland to have such rights for the United Kingdom at that time.

Legal deposit library status
According to the Republic of Ireland's Copyright and Related Rights Act, 2000, the Library is entitled, along with the National Library of Ireland and the libraries of the National University of Ireland, the University of Limerick, and Dublin City University, to receive a copy of all works published in the Republic of Ireland.

Also, as a result of the British Legal Deposit Libraries Act 2003, which continues a more ancient right dating from 1801, the Library is entitled, along with the Bodleian Library at Oxford, Cambridge University Library, the National Library of Wales and the National Library of Scotland, to receive a copy on request of all works published in the United Kingdom. Many works are now being received electronically rather than in print under new UK regulations which came into force in April 2013.

Long Room

The  main chamber of the Old Library, the Long Room, was built between 1712 and 1732 and houses 200,000 of the Library's oldest books. Initially, The Long Room had a flat ceiling, shelving for books only on the lower level, and an open gallery. By the 1850s the room had to be expanded as the shelves were filled due to the fact that the Library had been given permission to obtain a free copy of every book that had been published in Ireland and Britain. In 1860, The Long Room's roof was raised to accommodate an upper gallery.
The Long Room is lined with marble busts. The marble bust collection was formed when 14 busts from the sculptor Peter Scheemakers were acquired by the college. Many of the busts are of great philosophers, writers, and men who supported the college. The most outstanding bust in the collection is of the writer Jonathan Swift, created by Louis François Roubiliac.

In November of 2020, Trinity College announced the addition of four marble busts featuring female scholars: Rosalind Franklin, Ada Lovelace, Augusta Gregory, and Mary Wollstonecraft. Notably, it is "the first time in over a century that Trinity has commissioned new sculptures for the Long Room of the Old Library." Following the unveiling, Trinity archivist Helen Shenton remarked, “As the first woman Librarian in the College’s 428-year history, I am especially delighted to champion this initiative to address the historic inequity in the Long Room.”

The Long Room also holds one of the last remaining copies of the 1916 Proclamation of the Irish Republic. This proclamation was read by Patrick Pearse near the General Post Office on 24 April 1916. Visitors may also view the Trinity College harp (also known as the "Brian Boru harp") in the Long Room that is the oldest of its kind in Ireland dating back to the 15th century. The harp is made out of oak and willow and includes 29 brass strings.

Beginning in 2022, the Long Room will be closed to the public as Trinity librarians undergo a €90m restoration project, utilizing €25m of government funding. The project is said to have "taken on a degree of urgency following the catastrophic fire which destroyed Notre-Dame de Paris cathedral in 2019." Accordingly, the project will prioritize the modernization of environmental control and fire protection measures.

In popular culture
The Jedi archives of the Jedi Temple in the movie Star Wars: Episode II – Attack of the Clones bear a startling resemblance to the Long Room of the Trinity College Library. This resemblance resulted in controversy as permission had not been sought to use the building's likeness in the film. However, Lucasfilm denied that the Long Room was the basis for the Jedi archives, and officials from Trinity College Library decided not to take any legal action.

In Foundation series the Long Room was a stand-in for a reading room in the imperial capital of Trantor.

References

Further reading
Fox, Peter Treasures of the Library: Trinity College Dublin. Dublin: Royal Irish Academy, 1986 
 Fox, Peter. Trinity College Library Dublin: A History (Cambridge University Press, 2014).
 Fox, Peter "The Librarians of Trinity College", in: Vincent Kinane, Anne Walsh, eds., Essays on the History of Trinity College Library, Dublin. Dublin: Four Courts Press, 2000 
 Rogers, Charles. "Notes in the History of Sir Jerome Alexander, Second Justice of the Court of Common Pleas, and Founder of the Alexander Library, Trinity College, Dublin." Transactions of the Royal Historical Society 1 (1872): 220-40. doi:10.2307/3677907 online.

External links

Trinity College Library Dublin
Search the Library's catalogue
The Library of Trinity College Dublin at Google Cultural Institute
360-degree panorama of the Long Room Library

Academic libraries in Ireland
Library
Deposit libraries
History of Dublin (city)
Libraries in Dublin (city)
Library
 
Libraries established in 1592